This is a list of major Hindu temples in Nepal, alphabetically sorted by district.

Bajura District 

 Badimalika Temple (बडिमालिका मन्दिर )

Bara District 

 Gadhimai Temple
 Kankali Temple, Simraungadh
 Katghat Temple, Jitpursimara
 Ranivas Temple, Simraungadh
 Shree Ram Mandir, Nijgadh

Baitadi District 
 Tripura Sundari Temple

Bhaktapur District 

 Anantalingeshwor Mahadev
 Ashapuri Mahadev Temple 
 Aananta lingeshwor Mahadev
 Balakhu Ganesh
 Balkumari temple, Bhaktapur, Thimi
 Balkumari Dyochhen
 Barahi Dyochhen
 Bhadrakali Dyochhen
 Bhairav Temple
 Brahmayani Dyochhen
 Changu Narayan
 Chhonga Ganesh
 Chhuma Ganesh
 Dakshin Barahi Temple, Thimi
 Dattatraya Temple
 Doleshwor Mahadeva Temple
 Indrayani Dyochhen
 Jalbinayak Temple
 Kumari Dyochhen
 Lhasapasa Saraswoti Temple
 Mahalaxmi Temple, Bode
 Maheshowri Dyochhen
 Matshya Narayan
 Neel Barahi Temple, Bode
 Nyatapola
 Phashi Temple
 Siddhibinayak Temple
 SiddhiGanesh Temple
 Shiddi Laxmi
 Suryavinayak Temple
 Suwarneshwor Manadev
 Siddhikali Temple, Thimi
 Taleju Temple
 Thalbinayak Temple
 Tripura Sundari Dyochhen
 Vatsala Durga Temple
 WakuPati Narayan Temple
 Yaksheshwor Mahadeva Temple

Biratnagar 
 Ashta Chiranjeevi Mandir, Madhumaraa
 Bagalamukhi Mandir, Bagalamukhi
 Banaskhandi Shiva Mandir, Devkota Chowk
 Birateshwar Shiva Mandir, Main Road
 Durga Mandir, Pichhara
 Ganesh Mandir, Hospital Chowk
 Geeta Mandir, Haatkhola
 Hanuman Mandir, Budhahaat Chowk
 Hanuman Mandir, Teenpaini
 Kali Mandir, Main Road
 Radha Krishna Mandir, Panee Tanki
 Radha Raman Mandir, Bargachhi
 Ram Janaki Mandir, Thakurbari Road
 Shani Mandir, Hanumandas Road
 Shiva Mandir, Malaya Road

Birendranagar 
 Deutibajy Mandir
 Kakrebihar Mandir
 Ugratara Mandir 
 Gathal Mandhir

Birgunj 
 Mahavir Mandir
 Maisthan Mandir
 Gita Mandir
 Surya Mandir

Chitwan District 
 Devghat Mandir
 Bageshwari Mandir
 Gansehthan Mandir
 Zakhadi Mai Mandir
 Kalika Mandir
 Pasupatinath Mandir
 Rameshwar Mandir

Dailekh 
 Padukasthan
 Shreesthan
 Navisthan
 Kotila
 Dungeshwor Temple
 Dhuleshwor
 Belaspur Temple
 Thama Chaughera Maisthan
 Dewal
 Saatkhamba

Dhankuta District
 Gokundeshwar Mahadev Mandir, Tallo Kopche
 Chintang Devi temple (Jalpadevi Temple)
 Narwadeshwar Mahadev Mandir, Sirwani
 Nishan Bhagawati Temple, Bich Bazaar 
 Pathivara Devi Temple, Bhedetar
 Saraswati Mandir, Salleri Ban
 Shiva Panchayan Mandir ( Bisranti Temple)

Dhanusha District 
 Janaki Mandir
 Ram Mandir
 Janak Mandir
 Sankat Mochan Mandir
 Shiva Mandir
 Mahabir jhanda mandir (In Bhathihan Bazar)
 Bhola Baba Mandir,Also known as Shree Sapteshwornath Mandir (in Kushmaha Satoshar)
 Dhanusha Dham Mandir (in Dhanusha Dham)
 Durga Bhawani Mandir()   (सबैला बजार,धनुषा)
 Shree Ram Janaki Mandir() (सबैला बजार, धनुषा)
 Hanuman Mandir() (हनुमान चौक, सबैला, धनुषा)
 Shree Radhakrishna Mandir() ( गोविन्दपुर, सबैला, धनुषा)

Dharan
Budha Subba Temple-(Dharan, Nepal) 
 Dantakali Temple
 Bishnupaduka
 Pindeshwor Temple
 Panchakanya
 Barahakshetra

Dolpa
 Bala Tripura Sundari Temple

Dolakha
Dolakha Bhimsen Temple

Darchula District 
 Malikarjun Temple

Gorkha District 
 Manakamana Temple
 Gorkha Kalika (Gorkha Bazar)
Akala Temple (Naharkee mains)

Jhapa 
 Kankai Mai 
 Kichakbadh 
 Satasidham 
 Arjundhara
 Laxmi Narayan mandir, Charali

Kanchanpur District 
 Sidhhanath temple

Kaski District 
 Bhimkali Mandir
 Bindhyabasini temple
 Tal Barahi Temple
 Dhodbarahi Mandir (Tanhu)
 Kalika Mandir' Kalikasthan, Kalika V.D.C.-4
 Bhadrakali Temple भद्रकाली मन्दिर 
 Sitaladevi Mandir 
 Akala Devi Temple
 Mudula Karki Kulayan Mandir
 Kedareshwor Mahadev Temple 
 Kumari Temple
 Kalika temple Mattikhan 15 km south from Pokhara
 Dhor Barahi Temple
 Narayansthan Temple
 Thulibidi Jhakri 
 Nirajan Adhikari 
 Phewa Taal Vitri Temple

Kathmandu District 
 Koteshwor Mahadev ( the patron deity of Nepal)
 Pashupatinath Temple ( the patron deity of Nepal)
 Swayambhunath temple ( worshipped by Buddhists and Hindus)
 Kasthamandap ( the temple after which Kathmandu was named. It is also known as Gorakhnath Temple)
 Ashok Binayak Temple, Maru Tol
 Karyabinayak Temple
 Mahadev Parwati Temple, Kathmandu
 Degutaleju Temple, Kathmandu
 Kumari Chhen ( the temple of living Goddess)
 Majipa Lakhey Chhen ( the residence of Shanta Bhairab Majipa Lakhey)
 Jaishidewal, Kathmandu
 Sapana Tirtha Temple Tokha, Kathmandu
 Chandeshwori Temple Tokha, Kathmandu
 Indreni Temple Bhutkhel, Tokha, Kathmandu
 Naradevi Temple ( Swetakaali temple)
 Raktakali Temple
 Pachali Bhairabh
 Taleju Bhawani Temple (Kathmandu)
 Shobha Bhagwati Mandir
 Bhadrakali Temple (Kathmandu)
 Maitidevi Temple
 Bhairava Kal Bhairab
 Batuk Bhairab Temple
 Guhyeshwari Temple
 Bhagwatibahal Temple
 Gyaneshwor Mahadev & Bhairavsthan
 Sankata, (Te Bahal, Newroad)
 Mahankal ( the deity is common in Hinduism and Buddhism)
 Chabahil Ganesh Temple
 Chamunda Devi Temple, Jorpati
 Akash Bhairav Temple
 Budhanilkantha Temple
 Sohrakhutte Ganesh
 Sohrahate Ganesh
 Bhimsensthan
 Swet Bhairab Temple
 Ganesh Temple (New Road)
 Ranamukteshwar Temple, Pako Pukhuldhyang, New Road
 Ram Temple (Battisputali), Battisputali
 Pulukishi Chhen ( the house of Airawat elephant, the Bahan of Indra, Kilagha
 Palanchowk Bhagwati (Hyumat)
 Bagbhairaw Temple
 Asthanarayan Temple
 Dakshinkali Temple
 Budanilkintha Temple((Budanilkintha narayan mandir ))
 Aadi nath temple    ((Chovar ))
 Bishnu Davi Tempel  ((Bhajangal), Kirtipur
 Uma mahashwor Temple ((Kirtipur))
 Ses Narayan temple   (( Farping near Dakshinkali Temple))
 Taudaha nagraja   (( Chovar ))
 Jal Binayak Temple  ((Chovar))
 Jwala Mai Temple ((Tyouda, Ason)), Kathmandu
 Jagannath Temple (Hanuman-Dhoka Durbar Square)
 Mahendreswor Temple  (Hanuman-Dhoka Durbar Square)
 Trilokya Mohan Narayan Temple  (Hanuman-Dhoka Durbar Square)
 Narayan Temple ((Narayan Hiti Palace)), Kathmandu
 Naxal Bhagawati ((Bhagawati Bahal, Naxal)) Kathmandu
 Shri Radha Madhava Temple, Budhanilkantha, Kathmandu
Gokarneshwor Mahadev Temple, Kathmandu
Uttar Bahini Temple, Gokarneshwor, Kathmandu
Swasthani mata temple, Sankhu, Kathmandu
Bajrayogini Temple, Sankhu, Kathmandu
Madhav Narayan Temple, Sankhu, Kathmandu
Shree Nawatan Dham, Gothatar, Kathmandu
Kirateshwor Mahadev Temple, Pashupatinath, Kathmandu
Tundal Devi Temple, Hadigaun
Tripureshwor Mahadev Temple, Tripureshwor, Kathmandu

Kavrepalanchowk District 
 Chandeshwari Temple
 Dhaneshwor Temple
 Bhagwati Temple
 Narayan Temple
 Mahadev Mandir
 Palanchok Bhagawati Temple
 Astamatrika
 Unnmat Bhairab
 Biseshor Mahadev
 Indreshor Mahdev
Indreswor Mandir, Panauti
Gaukureshwor Temple, Dhulikhel
GaneshTemple, Dhulikhel

Lalitpur District 
 Bajra Barahi Temple (Bajra Barahi)
 Balkumari Temple, Lalitpur 
 Bangalamukhee Temple
 Batuk Bhairab (Lagankhel)
 Bhubaneswori Temple (Nakabahil)
 Bimsen Temple (Mangal Bazar)
 Bishankhu Narayan Temple (Sundhara)
 Bishwokarma (Ikhalukhu)
 Chapat Ganesh Temple (Chapat)
 Chamunda Temple (Patan)
 Chinnamasta (Mangal Bazar)
 Dhanawantari Barahi Temple (Jwagal)
 Govrateshwor Mahadev Temple (Luvu)
 Hayagriva Bhairava Temple (Bungamati)
 Jal Binayak
 Karya Binayak
 Kopeshwor Mahadev (Mangal Bazar)
 Krishna Mandir (Patan)
 Kumari Chhen (Patan)
 Kumbheshwar Temple
 Min Nath (Tangal)
 Matangi (Mangal Bazar)
 Manakamana (Patan)
 Mani Keshav Narayan Temple (Swotha)
 Mahabouddha Temple (Sundhara)
 Mahalaxmi Temple (Lagankhel)
 Santaneshwor Mahadev Temple (Bajra Barahi)
 Phulchowki Temple (Phulchowki)
 Rato Machhindra Nath Temple (Bungamati)
 Rato Machhindra Nath Temple (Tangal)
 Shwet Barahi Temple (Bandegaun)
 Siddhi Laxmi (Purnachandi)
 Taleju Mandir (Patan)
 Tamak Dhyo (Jawalakhel)
 Tika Bhairab (Lele)
Ram Mandir, Lamatar
hanuman mandir

Mahottari
Jaleshwar Mahadev Temple

Makawanpur 
 Bhutandevi Temple
 Pashupatinath Temple
 Manakamana Temple
 Churiyamai Temple
 Banaskhandi Temple
 Bansagopal Temple
 Pathivara Temple
 Kusmanda Sarowar Triveni Dham

Nepalgunj 
 Bageshwori Temple (Nepalgunj)

Nawalparasi, Nepal 
 Daunne Devi Temple
 Maula Kalika Temple
Triveni Dham
 Sri Laxmi-Narasimha Divya Dham (Only Divya Desham in Nepal along with Muktinath Temple)
 Sri Laxmi-Hari Mandir
 Sri Radha-Krishna Madir (Nimbarka Kendra - Vrindawan Pratik)
 Sri Laxmi Venkatesh Mandir (Ved Vidya Ashram)

Saptari District
 Chinnamasta Bhagawati Temple, Sakhda
 Kankalini Temple, Bhardah
 Rajdevi Temple, Rajbiraj
 Shambhunath Temple, Sambhunath
 Chandi Bhagawati Temple, Rajbiraj
 Baishnawi Kali Temple, Rajbiraj
 Bageshwari Temple, Rajbiraj
 Radha Krishna Temple, Rajbiraj
 Krishna Mandir, Rajbiraj 
 Harinandeshwor Mahadev Mandir, Rajbiraj
 Balaji Devsthan Hanuman Mandir, Rajbiraj
 Dakneshwori Temple, Pato
 Bishnu Mandir, Rupnagar
 Ram Mandir, Rajbiraj
 Krishnaram Marauti, Agnisair
 Dinabhadri, Kataiya
 Sani Dham, Terhauta
 Hanuman Mandir, Hanumannagar

Sinduplachowk 
Listi devi mandir
Gaurati Bhimsen Temple
Kshama devi mandir
Bankali Mandir Gorsu
Sutkeri Dhunga Gorsu

Tanahun 
 Aakala devi 
 Andhimul Temple
 Bindebasini Temple, Bandipur
 Chhabdi Barahi Mandir
 Dhor Barahi Mandir
 Khadgamai Temple, Bandipur
 Shiva Mandir, Teendhara, Bandipur
 Shivalaya Mandir, Bandipur-3, Seratar
 Thanimai temple

Taplejung 
 Pathibhara Devi Temple (Teplejung)

Tehrathum 
 Singha Bahini Temple 
 Siddhadevi temple 
 Jal Kanya Devi Temple 
 Pancha Kanya Devi

Other District 
Sri Nrsimha dham kshetra, salyantar, Dhading (Jagannath Foundation-SRPV) 
 Gadhimai Temple 
 Muktinath Temple
 Chandannath Temple (Jumla)
 Narayanthan
 Kirateshwor Mahadev
 Lalita Devi Mandir
  Kalinchwork Bhagwati Mandir (dolakha)
 Chanya Chatra - Syangja
 Tauleshwarnath Mandir- Kapilvastu
 Kalika Bhagawati Temple (Baglung)
 Jalkeshwor Mahadev -(Pattharkot, Sarlahi)
 Baidyanath Dham (Achham)

Palpa
 Bhairabsthan Temple
 Siddha Baba Temple

Rukum west
 Digresaikumari bhagawati, Tharpu

References

Nepal
Hindu temples
Hindu temples in Nepal